Perumbavoor (/peɾumbɐːʋuːr/; Malayalam: പെരുമ്പാവൂർ) is a place located at the bank of Periyar (Poorna River) in Ernakulam District in the Indian state of Kerala. It is a part of the Kochi metropolitan area. It lies in the northeastern tip of the Greater Cochin area and is also the headquarters of Kunnathunad Taluk. Perumbavoor is famed in the state for wood industries and small-scale industries. Ernakulam lies 30 km southwest of Perumbavoor. The town lies between Angamaly and Muvattupuzha on the Main Central Road (MC), which connects Thiruvananthapuram to Angamaly through the old Travancore part of Kerala.

Perumbavoor has many immigrants from other parts of India, including West Bengal, Orissa, and Uttar Pradesh. Most work in plywood or other industries. Tamils, Assamese, and Nepalese have special colonies of their own.

The state government and the Greater kochi development authority have plans to include Angamaly, Perumbavoor, Piravom, and Kolenchery in Ernakulam district; Mala and Kodungallur in Thrissur district; Thalayolaparambu and Vaikom in Kottayam; and Cherthala in Alappuzha district within the Kochi metropolitan limits. The newly formed metropolis would be put under the charge of a new authority called Kochi Metropolitan Regional Development Authority.

History

Perumbavoor municipality was formed in 1936. It was one among the 4 Panchayats sanctioned by Sir C. P. Ramaswamy Iyer (Diwan-Thiruvithamcore). The others were Paravur, Nedumangad and Boothapandi. Perumbavoor constituency is one of the most Jacobite Christian populated areas in India.

Politics 
Perumbavoor assembly constituency is a part of Chalakudy (Lok Sabha constituency).
Eldhose Kunnapilly is the current MLA from Perumbavoor and Benny Behanan is the current MP.

Judicial institutions
Its jurisdiction formerly encompassed the towns of Alwaye and Kolenchery, which were separated later. It has a Judicial Magistrate of the First Class, Motor Accident Claims Tribunal, and Subordinate Judge's Court (Sub-court).

Economy
Perumbavoor is a predominantly agricultural town and Asia's Largest plywood industries. Commodities like rubber, pepper, ginger, turmeric, plantain, vegetables, coconut, nutmeg, cocoa, rice, arecanut, cloves, etc. are traded every day in the local market. Most of these commodities are supplied to mainstream exporters in Kochi or to local retailers. Rest of the economy is shared by government and private sectors and small industries. Perumbavoor is an important city for timber trade in Kerala.

Migrant workers
The economy of Perumbavoor town is highly dependent on more than one lakh migrant workers from different Indian states. Perumbavoor provides all facilities to them, like labour camps, social awareness programs, entertainment programs, and health and educational care, including a special school for children of migrant workers.

Image gallery
Pictures of the town taken on 9 July-2012 at 8:00 AM

Famous People

Transportation
KL-40 is the RTO code for Kunnathunad Taluk and Perumbavoor. Perumbavoor JRTO is situated at Pattal. Perumbavoor has got a KSRTC Subdepot operating several long-distance services to places inside and outside Kerala. Private bus services run into several neighbouring towns. AutoRickshaws are commonly used for small distances. There is frequent bus services to Ernakulam, Aluva, Angamaly, Kothamangalam, Muvattupuzha, Kolenchery, Thrippunithura etc. from here. The nearest railway stations are Angamaly and Aluva.  The Cochin International Airport at Nedumbassery is only 14 km from the town.

Perumbavoor is surrounded by many small but populous commuter villages, connected to the town by bus services. The notable ones are Vallam, Koovappady, Vengola, Mudickal, Thottuva, Ponjassery, Manjappetty, Kodanad, Akanad, Alattuchira, Panamkuzhy, Cheranalloor, Punnayam, Odakkaly, Panichayam, Payyal, Nedungapra, Kallil, Malayidomthuruth, Kottapady, Keezhillam etc. Kuruppampady town, is one of the main interchange points for public transport.

Places to visit
Paniyely Poru.
Kaprikkadu Abhayarnyam.
Kodanad Elephant Training Camp.
Periyar River
Thottuva dhanwanthari temple
Kalady Shankara Stoopam.
Kallil Jain Temple.
Iringol Kavu Forest.
Nagancherry Mana.
Pettamala Mountain Top.
Puliyanipara Mountain.
Chooramudi Mountain

Educational organizations

Healthcare
Even though Perumbavoor has a Government Taluk Headquarters hospital, and several private hospitals, numerous dental health care centers, hi-tech labs, health care sector remains underdeveloped especially for trauma, emergency and specialty health care.

Main hospitals

Church

Mosque

Temple

How to reach
Perumbavoor, lies in the north eastern corner of Kochi urban area. The geographic advantages of Perumbavoor is that, NH 47 lies closer to this town apart from Main Central Road and Aluva-Munnar highway passing through this place. Perumbavoor is surrounded by important towns like Aluva, Muvattupuzha, Kothamangalam,  Angamaly etc. in close distances. Important suburban regions of Kochi like Aluva, Kalamassery, Kakkanad, Thrippunithura are all in close proximity to Perumbavoor. 
 Kochi- Edapally-Pookkattupady-Chembarakky (34 km)
 Thodupuzha- Vazhakkulam-Muvattupuzha-Keezhillam (41 km)
 Thrissur- Chalakudy-Angamaly (59 km)
 Kottayam- Ettumanoor-Koothattukulam-Muvattupuzha (76 km)
 Alappuzha- Cherthala-Kundannoor Junction-Petta Junction-Pallikkara-Kizhakkambalam (85 km)
 Munnar- Pallivasal-Adimaly-Kothamangalam (98 km)
 Trivandrum- Kottarakkara- Pandalam - Changanassery-Kottayam-Muvattupuzha (228 km)

See also
 Kochi
 Piravom
 Kothamangalam
 Aluva
 Muvattupuzha

References

External links

Ernakulam District website
Perumbavoornews
Kuruppampady
Places of worship in Perumbavoor
 Remaining Date for Perumbavoor Municipality Election 2020

Suburbs of Kochi
Cities and towns in Ernakulam district